There are several school districts in the United States called Unity School District, including:

Unity School District — Claremont, New Hampshire
Unity School District — Balsam Lake, Wisconsin